Sir Ralph Noel, 6th Baronet (28 July 1747 – 19 March 1825) was a British landowner and politician, and father-in-law of Lord Byron. Before 1815 he was known as Sir Ralph Milbanke.

Biography
He was the eldest son of Sir Ralph Milbanke, 5th Baronet, and his wife Elizabeth, daughter of John Hedworth. His uncle John Milbanke was married to a sister of the Whig leader Lord Rockingham, and his sister was the political hostess Lady Melbourne. On 9 January 1777 he married Judith Noel, daughter of Lord Wentworth; they had one daughter, Anne Isabella. Milbanke succeeded his father as sixth baronet on 8 January 1798. The family lived at Seaham Hall, County Durham, but also owned property in Northumberland and Yorkshire.

Milbanke was elected Member of Parliament for County Durham at the 1790 general election. A Foxite Whig, he supported abolition of the slave trade and Catholic emancipation. By 1812, worsening health and declining finances obliged him to retire from the Commons. Milbanke's wife Judith succeeded to the Leicestershire estates of her brother Thomas in 1815 and on 29 May that year Milbanke adopted the surname of Noel by royal licence. He was succeeded in the baronetcy by his nephew John Penistone Milbanke. Lady Noel had died in 1822, and in 1856 their daughter Lady Byron succeeded as 11th Baroness Wentworth.

References

1747 births
1825 deaths
People educated at Westminster School, London
Alumni of Trinity College, Cambridge
Baronets in the Baronetage of England
British MPs 1790–1796
British MPs 1796–1800
UK MPs 1801–1802
UK MPs 1802–1806
UK MPs 1806–1807
UK MPs 1807–1812
Whig (British political party) MPs for English constituencies